Hammonds Plains-Lucasville is a provincial electoral district in  Nova Scotia, Canada, that elects one member of the Nova Scotia House of Assembly. The riding was created in 2012 with 43 per cent of the former district of Hammonds Plains-Upper Sackville, 10 per cent of the district of Timberlea-Prospect and 7 per cent of the district of Chester-St. Margaret's.

Geography

Members of the Legislative Assembly
This riding has elected the following Members of the Legislative Assembly:

Election results

|-

|Liberal
|Ben Jessome
|align="right"|3,402
|align="right"|52.24
|align="right"|N/A
|-

|New Democratic Party
|Peter Lund
|align="right"|1,583
|align="right"|24.31
|align="right"|N/A
|-

|Progressive Conservative
|Gina Byrne
|align="right"|1,423
|align="right"|21.85
|align="right"|N/A
|-

|}

References

External links
 2013 riding profile

Nova Scotia provincial electoral districts
Politics of Halifax, Nova Scotia
2012 establishments in Nova Scotia